Chelvan Sara (also Romanized as Chelvān Sarā; also known as Chalmansarā) is a village in Khorgam Rural District, Khorgam District, Rudbar County, Gilan Province, Iran. At the 2006 census, its population was 66, in 19 families.

References 

Populated places in Rudbar County